The 1985–86 A Group was the 38th season of the A Football Group, the top Bulgarian professional league for association football clubs, since its establishment in 1948.

Overview
It was contested by 16 teams, and Beroe Stara Zagora won the championship.

League standings

Results

Champions
Beroe Stara Zagora

Top scorers

References
Bulgaria - List of final tables (RSSSF)

First Professional Football League (Bulgaria) seasons
Bulgaria
1985–86 in Bulgarian football